Shivajith (born 16 December 1982) is an Indian actor from Kerala, who made his debut in the multilingual film Veeram (2016) directed by Jayaraj.

Biography

Shivajith was born to Padmanabhan Nambiar and M. R. Madanavalli in a small village called Thalavil, Kannur. He has a sister Shijina Padmanabhan.

Shivajith started pursuing his passion for arts early in life and started learning Kathakali, Bharatanatyam, Kuchipudi and also to play Mridangam. He won the title of 'Kalaaprathibha' for two consecutive years 1998 and 1999 at the Kerala State Youth Festival (now called Kerala School Kalolsavam), breaking all the existing records. For the film Veeram (2016), he practiced Kalaripayattu for two years and his skills as a Kalari artist is a major highlight of the movie where he portrayed the Aromal Chekavar.

He became a popular actor after his character ''Amarnath" in the movie Kalki with Tovino Thomas.

Filmography

References

External links 
 

21st-century Indian male actors
Living people
Male actors from Kannur
Male actors in Malayalam cinema
1982 births